The GER Class 209 (LNER Class Y5) was a class of 0-4-0 saddle tank steam locomotives of the Great Eastern Railway. These locomotives were similar to the NBR G Class but had flat-topped, instead of round-topped, tanks.  A total of eight were built – four by Neilson and Company in 1874 and four more by the GER's Stratford Works between 1897 and 1903.

Overview

Neilson locomotives
In order to shunt locations with tight curves and weight restrictions, two 0-4-0T locomotives were purchased from Neilson and Company to one of that company's standard designs by the GER, and this was followed by an order for a further two locomotives in 1876. In 1894–1895 these four locos were rebuilt under James Holden, the work including new boilers, steam brakes, and covered cabs. Two of these locomotives worked at Globe Road & Devonshire Street goods yards between 1874 and 1914.

Stratford locomotives
In 1897 two new locomotives were built at Stratford Works, identical to the rebuilt 209 Class, but with slightly higher bunkers, and a further two locomotives to this new design were built, also at Stratford, in 1903.

LNER ownership
Four locomotives had been withdrawn or sold before 1923. The remaining four passed into London and North Eastern Railway ownership at the grouping in 1923. Their LNER class was Y5.

Withdrawal
Two locomotives, 226 and 227 were scrapped in 1911. By 1914, number 228 was placed on the duplicate list, becoming 0228; its old number being re-used by a new Class B74 (LNER Class Y4) locomotive. Number 210 was also scrapped in 1914, and 229 was sold in 1918. Number 7209 was withdrawn in 1926. Numbers 07228 and 7230 became departmental locomotives at Stratford, with the former being withdrawn in 1927, after having been used as a stationary boiler. Number 7231 had been adapted as a tram locomotive and used at Colchester, before being withdrawn in 1931.

BR ownership
The last member of the class left in service, 7230, was renumbered 8081 in 1944; and just survived into British Railways ownership in 1948 but was scrapped early that year before it could receive its BR number.

Table of orders and numbers

Key
 wdn. = withdrawal date, scrapping date unknown
 scr. = scrapping date

Preservation 

One locomotive, GER no. 229, was exhibited at the former North Woolwich Old Station Museum, which closed in 2008. This is the one which was sold in 1918. It is now (2012) at a site near Lydney, Gloucestershire, awaiting restoration to working order.

Modelling 
A 4 mm scale kit is available from High Level Kits.

See also 
 Minimum railway curve radius

References

Notes

Bibliography

External links 

  — Great Eastern Railway Society
 The Y5 (GER 209) Neilson & Co 0-4-0 Shunters — LNER Encyclopedia

209
0-4-0ST locomotives
Railway locomotives introduced in 1874
Neilson locomotives
Standard gauge steam locomotives of Great Britain
Shunting locomotives